The Greenville Commercial Historic District in Greenville, Mississippi is a  historic district that was listed on the National Register of Historic Places (NRHP) in 1997.

It includes 12 contributing buildings, covering the majority of the 200 block of Main Street, plus 300 Main Street, 200 Walnut Street, 206 Walnut Street, and 211 Walnut Street.  Among its properties are the Old Delta Democrat Times Building (c. 1880) at 201-203 Main St., and the First National Bank of Greenville (1903, designed by Barber & Klutz) which are both separately NRHP-listed.

References

Greenville, Mississippi
Italianate architecture in Mississippi
Neoclassical architecture in Mississippi
Historic districts on the National Register of Historic Places in Mississippi
National Register of Historic Places in Washington County, Mississippi